Coffee Mill Creek is a  tributary of the Red River in Texas.  It is part of the Mississippi River watershed.  It flows entirely within Fannin County.

See also
List of rivers of Texas

References

USGS Hydrologic Unit Map - State of Texas (1974)

Rivers of Texas
Tributaries of the Red River of the South
Bodies of water of Fannin County, Texas